Franz Josef Hinkelammert (Emsdetten, January 12, 1931)  is a German-born theologian and economist, an influential theorist of liberation theology who writes theological critiques of capitalism. He is one of the co-founders of the influential Departamento Ecuménico de Investigaciones in Sabanilla, Costa Rica, along with Hugo Assmann and Pablo Richard.

He holds a doctorate in economics from the Free University of Berlin. He served on the faculty of the Catholic University of Chile from 1963 to 1973.

After the Pinochet coup, he went to the Departmento Ecuménico de Investigaciones in Sabanilla, Costa Rica. He has written extensively and critically about the neoliberal economic model, anti-utopian and anti-socialist views within religion and politics as well as the syncretism of Marxism and Christianity. His criticisms include those of the economists Milton Friedman, Friedrich Hayek as well as the philosopher Karl Popper.

References 

Hinkelammert, F., The Ideological Weapons of Death: A Theological Critique of Capitalism,  translated by Phillip Berryman with an introduction by Cornel West, 1986.
 Hinkelammert, F., Crítica de la Razón Utópica, 1983.
  Duchrow, I. and Hinkelammert, F., Property for People, Not for Profit: Alternatives to the Global Tyranny of Capital, 2004

1931 births
Living people
German economists
German anti-capitalists
German male non-fiction writers
Liberation theologians
Free University of Berlin alumni